Webster Wagner House was a historic home located at Palatine Bridge in Montgomery County, New York. It was built in 1876 and designed by architect Horatio Nelson White (1814–1892) as the home for railroad car magnate Webster Wagner (1817–1882).  It consisted of a -story main block with a 2-story rear service wing.  It featured a 3-story entrance tower at the southeast corner.

It was added to the National Register of Historic Places in 1973. The home was a victim of demolition by neglect.

See also 
 Rail Car Grand Isle: A preserved Wagner Palace car
 National Register of Historic Places listings in Montgomery County, New York

References

Houses on the National Register of Historic Places in New York (state)
Houses completed in 1876
Houses in Montgomery County, New York
National Register of Historic Places in Montgomery County, New York
Former buildings and structures in New York (state)